BFE may refer to:

 Bacterial Filtration Efficiency, a measurement of filtration efficiency of filtration systems such as surgical face masks
 Base Flood Elevation, a level set by the Federal Emergency Management Agency based on 100 year flood models; see Flood opening
 Bastard Film Encounter, a US-based film festival
 Beweissicherungs- und Festnahmeeinheiten or arrest units, police support groups in Germany
 British Film Editors, a not-for profit honorary society of professional British Film and Television Editors
 Brooklyn Funk Essentials, a music collective
 Serious Sam 3: BFE, a video game
 BFE, the National Rail station code for Bere Ferrers railway station, Devon, England

See also
 ISO 639:bfe or Betaf language, a Papuan language of Indonesia
 5-MeO-BFE or Dimemebfe, a recreational drug and research chemical